Second French Jewish Statute, Act of 2 June 1941 (La Loi du 2 juin 1941, Statut des Juifs), was an anti-semitic Act that was created by Vichy France and signed into law by Marshall Pétain, that replaced the Law of 3 October 1940, that defined an increasingly stringent definition of who was a Jew in France. It specified the definition, in the legal sense, of the expression Jewish race, broadening the criteria for belonging to the Jewish race and extended the scope of professional prohibitions. From that point on, Jews in France became second-class citizens, whereas since 21 September 1791, they were full citizens.

Purpose and scope
Published in the Journal Officiel de l'État Francais on 14 June 1941 during the François Darlan government, the second status of the Jews linked membership of the "Jewish race" to the religion of the grandparents. At the same time, in line with an assimilationist ideology invented by Charles Maurras and promoted by Action Française between the wars, it multiplied the exceptions for those who had made themselves useful to the nation and the prohibitions for the others.

Applicable throughout the French Empire, in fact in metropolitan France, in the northern and southern zones, and in Algeria, it concerned around 150,000 French Jews and as many foreigners. It inaugurated a policy of quotas in France by introducing numerus clausus which were fixed by decree.

Context
This statute was part of a series of laws against Jews and foreigners passed between 1938 and 1944. Between July 1940 to August 1944, the Vichy government produced 143 laws and regulatory acts relating to the condition of the Jews. The first definition of the term "Jewish race", logically imperfect, was enacted under the government of Pierre Laval on 3 October 1940 by the law on the status of Jews.

The two successive statutes were used during the occupation, mainly from April 1942 onwards and the allocation of resources to the Commissariat-General for Jewish Affairs, to implement a corporatist and "racial" antisemitic policy within the framework of the Révolution nationale. They subsequently served as the legal basis for the "collaboration" of the French police in the deportation of Jews from Europe, North Africa, and the Levant.

Text of the law translated

Law of 2 June 1941 replacing the law of 3 October 1940 on the status of the Jews.

We, Marshal of France, Head of the French State, having heard the Council of Ministers, decree:

Article 1
A Jew is considered to be:

 A person, whether or not he or she belongs to any denomination, who is descended from at least three grandparents of the Jewish race, or from only two if his or her spouse is descended from two grandparents of the Jewish race. A grandparent who belonged to the Jewish religion is considered to be of Jewish race;
 A person who belongs to the Jewish religion, or belonged to it on 25 June 1940, and who is descended from two grandparents of the Jewish race. Non-membership of the Jewish religion is established by proof of membership of one of the other denominations recognised by the State before the law of 9 December 1905. The disavowal or annulment of the recognition of a child considered to be Jewish has no effect with regard to the preceding provisions.

Article 2
Access to and exercise of the public functions and mandates listed below are forbidden to Jews:

 Head of State, members of the Government, the Council of State, the Council of the National Order of the Legion of Honour, the Court of Cassation, the Court of Auditors, the Corps of Mines, the Corps of Bridges and Roads, the General Inspectorate of Finance, the Corps of Aeronautical Engineers, the Courts of Appeal, the Courts of First Instance, the Justice of the Peace, the Criminal Courts of Algeria, all juries, all professional jurisdictions and all assemblies resulting from elections, and arbitrators.
 French ambassadors, secretaries-general of ministerial departments, directors-general, directors of the central administrations of ministries, officials of the Department of Foreign Affairs, prefects, sub-prefects, secretaries-general of prefectures, inspectors-general of administrative services in the Ministry of the Interior, officials of all grades attached to all police services.
 Residents general, governors-general, governors and secretaries-general of colonies, inspectors of colonies.
 Members of the teaching profession.
 Officers and non-commissioned officers of the army, the sea and the air force, members of the war, navy and air force control corps, members of the civilian corps and staff of the war, navy and air force departments, created by the laws of 25 August 1940, 15 September 1940, 28 August 1940, 18 September 1940 and 29 August 1940.
 Administrators, directors, general secretaries in companies benefiting from concessions or subsidies granted by a public authority, holders of posts appointed by the Government in companies of general interest.

Article 3
Jews may not occupy, in public administrations or companies benefiting from concessions or subsidies granted by a public authority, functions or jobs other than those listed in Article 2, unless they meet one of the following conditions

 a- Hold the veteran's card, instituted by Article 101 of the law of 19 December 1926;
 b- Having been the subject, during the 1939-1940 campaign, of a citation entitling them to wear the Croix de Guerre instituted by the decree of 28 March 1941;
 c- Be decorated with the Legion of Honour or the Military Medal for acts of war;
 d- Be a ward of the nation or the ascendant, widow or orphan of a soldier who died for France.

Article 4

Jews may not exercise a liberal profession, a commercial, industrial or artisanal profession, or a free profession, hold a public or ministerial office, or be invested with functions devolved to auxiliaries of justice, except within the limits and under the conditions which shall be fixed by decrees of the Council of State.

Article 5
The following professions are forbidden to Jews:

 Banker, money-changer, direct seller;
 Intermediary in stock exchanges or in commercial exchanges;
 Advertising agent;
 Real estate or capital lending agent;
 Business trader, property trader;
 Broker, commission agent;
 Forestry operator;
 Gaming dealer;
 Publisher, director, manager, administrator, editor, even as local correspondent, of newspapers or periodicals, except for publications of a strictly scientific or religious nature;
 Operator, director, administrator, manager of enterprises whose object is the manufacture, printing, distribution, or presentation of cinematographic films, director, director of photography, composer of scripts;
 Operator, director, administrator, manager of theatres or cinematographic halls;
 Entertainment contractor;
 Operator, director, administrator, manager of all enterprises related to broadcasting.

Public administration regulations shall lay down the conditions for the application of this Article for each category.

Article 6
In no case may Jews be members of the bodies responsible for representing or disciplining the professions referred to in Articles 4 and 5 of this Act.

Article 7
The Jewish civil servants referred to in Articles 2 and 3 shall be entitled to the rights defined below:

 Civil servants subject to the law of 14 April 1924 shall receive a retirement pension with immediate effect if they have completed the number of years of service required to qualify for this pension.
 If, without fulfilling this condition, they have completed at least fifteen years' actual service, they shall receive with immediate effect a pension calculated at the rate of one thirtieth of the minimum retirement pension for each year of category A service, or one twenty-fifth for each year of category B service or military service. The amount of this pension shall not exceed the minimum retirement pension plus, where appropriate, remuneration for bonuses for service outside Europe and for campaign benefits
 Civil servants subject to the national pension fund scheme for old age shall, if they have completed at least fifteen years' service, be entitled to immediate payment of an annual allowance equal to the amount of the old-age pension which would have been payable to them at the time of leaving the service if their statutory payments had been made from the outset with alienated capital. This allowance will cease to be paid as from the date on which their pension from the national pension fund becomes payable;
 The civil servants of the departments, communes or public establishments which have a special pension fund will benefit, with immediate enjoyment, from the seniority pension or the proportional pension fixed by their pension regulations, if they fulfil the conditions of length of service required for the opening of the right to one of these pensions;
 Staff members subject to the social insurance scheme and having completed at least fifteen years' service shall receive from the local authority or institution to which they belong an annual allowance equal to the fraction of the old-age pension constituted by the payment of the double contribution during the entire period during which they remained in service. This allowance will cease to be paid as from the date on which the pension becomes payable;
 Civil servants dependent on the inter-colonial pension fund or on local funds, and having at least fifteen years' effective service, shall receive a pension under conditions to be determined by a public administration regulation;
 Civil servants and agents who do not fulfill the conditions required for entitlement to the above pensions and allowances shall receive their salaries for a period to be determined by a public administration regulation;
 The situation of workers in military and industrial establishments of the State shall be regulated by a special law.

The Jewish civil servants or agents referred to in Articles 2 and 3 of the law of 3 October 1940 are considered to have ceased their functions on 20 December 1940.

Civil servants or agents who are affected by the new prohibitions laid down by the present law shall cease to perform their duties within two months of its publication.

The application of the provisions of the present law to prisoners of war is deferred until their return from captivity.

The Jewish officials or agents referred to in Articles 2 and 3 and currently prisoners of war shall cease to exercise their functions two months after their return from captivity.

The provisions of this law shall not apply to the ascendants, spouse or descendants of a prisoner of war until two months after the release of the prisoner.

With regard to personnel in overseas service, a decree issued on the proposal of the Secretaries of State concerned shall determine the conditions for the termination of their duties.

Article 8
The following may be exempted from the prohibitions provided for in this law: Jews

Who have rendered exceptional services to the French State;
Whose family has been established in France for at least five generations and has rendered exceptional services to the French State.

For the prohibitions provided for in Article 2, the decision is taken by individual decree issued by the Council of State on the report of the General Commissioner for Jewish Affairs and countersigned by the Secretary of State concerned.

For the other prohibitions, the decision is taken by decree of the General Commissioner for Jewish Affairs.

The decree or order must be duly motivated.

Exemptions granted under the above provisions are of a personal nature only and shall not create any rights in favour of the ascendants, descendants, spouse and collateral relatives of the beneficiaries.

Article 9
Without prejudice to the right of the prefect to order internment in a special camp, even if the person concerned is French, shall be punished :

By imprisonment of six months to two years and a fine of 500 F to 10,000 F, or by one of these two penalties only, any Jew who has engaged or attempted to engage in an activity which is prohibited to him by application of articles 4, 5 and 6 of the present law:
From one year to five years imprisonment and a fine of 1,000 F to 20,000 F, or one of these two penalties only, any Jew who has evaded or attempted to evade the prohibitions enacted by this law, by means of false declarations or fraudulent manoeuvres.

The court may, in addition, order the closure of the establishment.

Article 10
Civil servants who have ceased their functions by application of the law of 3 October 1940 and who may avail themselves of the provisions of the present law shall be entitled to apply for reinstatement under conditions to be laid down by decree in the Conseil d'Etat

Article 11
This law is applicable to Algeria, the colonies, protectorate countries, Syria and Lebanon.

Article 12
The law of 3 October 1940, amended by the laws of 3 April and 11 April 1941, is repealed; the regulations and decrees issued for its application are maintained in force until they are amended, if necessary, by new regulations and decrees.

Article 13
The present decree shall be published in the Journal Officiel and executed as a State law.

Done at Vichy, 2 June 1941.

Philippe Pétain.

By the Marshal of France, Head of the French State:

 The Admiral of the Fleet, Vice-President of the Council, Minister of State for Foreign Affairs, the Interior and the Navy, Admiral Darlan.
 The Keeper of the Seals, Minister of State for Justice, Joseph Barthélemy.
 The Minister of State for National Economy and Finance, Yves Bouthillier.
 General Huntziger, Minister of State for War.
 The Minister Secretary of State for Agriculture, Pierre Caziot.

Archives
  Also (in French) at https://gallica.bnf.fr/ark:/12148/bpt6k20323582/f3.item, immediately followed, on page 2476, by No. 2333, the Law of 2 June 1940, Prescribing the Census of Jews, https://gallica.bnf.fr/ark:/12148/bpt6k20323582/f4.item

Literature

See also
 Union générale des israélites de France
 Vichy Holocaust collaboration timeline

References

Vichy France
Judaism in France
Jewish French history
Antisemitism in France
1941 in France
France in World War II